was a Japanese samurai and the 11th head of the Fukubara clan during the Sengoku period. He was a maternal cousin of Mōri Motonari. 
Following the death of Motonari, Sadatoshi became one of the Goyonin who supported Mōri Terumoto along with Kikkawa Motoharu, Kobayakawa Takakage and Kuchiba Michiyoshi.

The Fukubara clan had been an important retainer of the Mōri clan since the daughter of Fukubara Hirotoshi, the eighth head of the Fukubara clan, married Mōri Hiromoto and gave birth to Mōri Motonari in 1497.

Fukubara Sadatoshi participated in the Battle of Miyajima in 1555, which helped liberate the Mōri clan from control of the Ouchi clan. Sadatoshi later led the force that surrounded Chōfukuji Temple by order of Motonari in 1557 and forced Ōuchi Yoshinaga to commit seppuku.

References

Samurai
1512 births
1593 deaths
Mōri clan